Frangiskos Sourpis (born 4 March 1943) is a former Greek footballer, centre-back for Panathinaikos from 1962 until 1973.

Career
Born in Kifisia, Sourpis was talented at the pole vault and volleyball, but chose to play football with Panathinaikos F.C. He partnered Takis Papoulidis in the centre of defence in the 4-3-3 formation that coach Stjepan Bobek used at Panathinaikos. He played a total of 11 seasons for Panathinaikos, winning the Greek Alpha Ethniki six times, two Greek Football Cups, and helped the club reach the 1971 European Cup Final.

Sourpis made four appearances for the full Greece national football team from 1964 to 1967.

References

1943 births
Living people
Greece international footballers
Panathinaikos F.C. players
Association football central defenders
Footballers from Athens
Greek footballers